Raúl Duarte Duarte Mungi (born 11 November 1944) is a Peruvian basketball player. He competed in the men's tournament at the 1964 Summer Olympics. Duarte's brothers, Enrique, Luis, and Ricardo were also professional basketball players. All four of them were during the 1964 Olympics.

References

External links
 

1944 births
Living people
Peruvian men's basketball players
1963 FIBA World Championship players
1967 FIBA World Championship players
Olympic basketball players of Peru
Basketball players at the 1964 Summer Olympics
People from Piura
Iowa State University alumni
South Dakota State Jackrabbits men's basketball players
Peruvian expatriate sportspeople
Expatriate basketball people in the United States
San Diego Rockets draft picks
20th-century Peruvian people